The  Denver Broncos season was the franchise's 27th year in professional football and its 17th with the National Football League (NFL). They finished the regular season with a record of 11–5, returned to the playoffs after a one-year absence, won the AFC Championship over the Cleveland Browns, and lost Super Bowl XXI to the New York Giants, the first of back to back Super Bowl losses for the team.

Offseason

NFL draft

Personnel

Staff

Roster

Regular season
The Broncos won their first six games of the season, before being defeated by the then-5-1 New York Jets on Monday Night Football. They won two more games to improve to 8–1, tied with the Jets for the best record in the league. Although they would go 3–4 down the stretch, alternating wins and losses, Denver still finished ahead of the Seahawks and Chiefs in first place in the AFC West.

Schedule

Game summaries

Week 1

Week 2

Week 12

Standings

Playoffs

They won their divisional playoff game against the Patriots at home 22–17.  They then played the Cleveland Browns in Cleveland for the AFC Championship.  The game culminated in the famous "Drive", where John Elway led a 98-yard drive for a touchdown pass to Mark Jackson to tie the game and send it to overtime, where they won by a field goal, 23–20.

AFC Divisional Playoff

AFC: Denver Broncos 22, New England Patriots 17

AFC Championship Game

This game is best remembered for The Drive when the Broncos drove 98 yards to tie the game with 37 seconds left in regulation, and Denver kicker Rich Karlis made the game-winning 33-yard field goal 5:38 into overtime.

The Browns scored first when quarterback Bernie Kosar threw a 6-yard touchdown pass to running back Herman Fontenot at the end of an 86-yard drive. But the Broncos then scored 10 unanswered points: Karlis' 19-yard field goal and running back Gerald Willhite's 1-yard rushing touchdown. Cleveland kicker Mark Moseley's 29-yard field goal before halftime tied the score, 10–10. The teams exchanged punts before Kosar completed a 48-yard touchdown pass to Brian Brennan with 5:43 remaining in regulation. Elway then led his team from their own 2-yard line to tie the game on wide receiver Mark Jackson's 5-yard touchdown reception with 37 seconds left in regulation. Karlis' game-winning field goal in overtime capped a 60-yard drive after the Browns were forced to punt.

The Drive Play by Play
The Browns had jumped to a 20–13 lead and the Broncos had muffed the ensuing kickoff when Elway took over, first-and-10 on their own 2-yard line, with 5:32 to play in the game.

1. – First down and 10, Denver 2-yard line. Sammy Winder 5-yard pass from Elway.
 
2. – Second down and 5, Denver 7-yard line. Winder 3-yard run.

3. – Third down and 2, Denver 10-yard line. Winder 2-yard run.

4. – First down and 10, Denver 12-yard line. Winder 3-yard run.

5. – Second down and 7, Denver 15-yard line. Elway 11-yard run.

6. – First down and 10, Denver 26-yard line. Steve Sewell 22-yard pass from Elway.

7. – First down and 10, Denver 48-yard line. S. Watson 12-yard pass from Elway.

Two-minute warning

8. – First down and 10, Cleveland 40-yard line (1:59 remaining). Incomplete pass by Elway, intended for Vance Johnson.

9. – Second down and 10, Cleveland 40-yard line (1:52 remaining). Dave Puzzilli sack of Elway, 8-yard loss.
 
10. – Third down and 18, Cleveland 48-yard line (1:47 remaining). Mark Jackson 20-yard pass from Elway.

11. – First down and 10, Cleveland 28-yard line (1:19 remaining). Incomplete pass by Elway, intended for Watson.

12. – Second down and 10, Cleveland 28-yard line (1:10 remaining). Steve Sewell 14-yard pass from Elway.

13. – First down and 10, Cleveland 14-yard line (:57 remaining). Incomplete pass by Elway, intended for Watson.

14. – Second down and 10, Cleveland 14-yard line (:42 remaining). John Elway 9-yard run (scramble).

15. – Third down and 1, Cleveland 5-yard line (:39 remaining). Mark Jackson 5-yard pass from Elway for the touchdown. Rich Karlis then adds the extra point to tie the game.

Super Bowl XXI
They played the Giants in Super Bowl XXI, losing 20–39, the first of Elway's five Super Bowls and the first of his three losses.  Despite leading 10–9 at halftime, the Broncos collapsed in the second half as the Giants scored 30 points to Denver's ten.

Super Bowl XXI: New York Giants 39, Denver Broncos 20

Statistics

Team stats 
Denver scored 378 points during the year, sixth in the NFL.  They gave up 327 points, 15th in the league.

The Broncos were 17th in the league in total offense, with 5,489 yards.  They had 3,811 passing yards and 1,678 rushing yards.  They had 22 passing touchdowns and 17 rushing touchdowns.

They were 17th in the league with 3,755 passing yards given up and 15th with 1,891 rushing yards given up.  They were 21st in overall defense with 5,646 yards given up.

The team's 11–5 record is their sixth-best 16-game season in franchise history.

Player stats 
 John Elway had 280 completions for 3,485 yards, 19 touchdowns and 13 interceptions.  He also had 52 rushes for 257 yards, third highest on the team, and one rushing touchdown.  He was fifth in the league in completions, ninth in total yards, and tenth in touchdowns.
 Mark Jackson had 38 receptions for 738 yards and one touchdown.  Steve Watson had 45 receptions for 699 yards and three touchdowns.  Vance Johnson had 31 receptions for 363 yards and two touchdowns.  Clint Sampson had 21 receptions for 259 yards.  Orson Mobley had 22 reception for 332 yards and one touchdown.
 The primary running back Sammy Winder had 240 rushes for 789 yards and 9 touchdowns, seventh highest in the league.  He also had five touchdown receptions, giving him 14 total touchdowns for the season, fourth in the league.  Gerald Willhite had 85 rushes for 365 yards and five rushing touchdowns and 64 receptions for 529 yards and 3 receiving touchdowns.
 Rich Karlis kicked 20 field goals out of 28 attempted, including the game-winning field goal in the AFC Championship Game.  He kicked 44 out of 45 extra points.

Awards and honors
 Keith Bishop, AFC Pro Bowl selection
 John Elway, AFC Pro Bowl selection
 Rulon Jones, AFC Pro Bowl selection
 Karl Mecklenburg, AFC Pro Bowl selection
 Dennis Smith, AFC Pro Bowl selection
 Sammy Winder, AFC Pro Bowl selection

References

External links
Denver Broncos – 1986 media guide
 1986 Denver Broncos at Pro-Football-Reference.com

Denver Broncos seasons
AFC West championship seasons
American Football Conference championship seasons
Denver Broncos
Denver Bronco